Brad Field is an English professional rugby union player who is dual registered and plays for both Hartpury College R.F.C. and Gloucester

References

Living people
English rugby union players
Gloucester Rugby players
Rugby union players from Wellington, Somerset
Year of birth missing (living people)
Rugby union scrum-halves